The Karelia Air Command (abbr. KarLsto) is the peace-time Finnish Air Force unit responsible for the protection of the airspace of Eastern and South-Eastern Finland. In spite of its name, the headquarters of the air command is not located in the Finnish historical province of Karelia, but in historical Savonia and the present-day province of Northern Savonia, at Kuopio Airport in Siilinjärvi.

The wing consists of some 20 F-18 Hornets, belonging to the No. 31 Sqn and six radar stations. The unit has about 600 personnel, of whom 450 are commissioned officers, NCOs and professional enlisted men and the other 150 are conscripts. The Headquarters no 7 is also located at the air force base.

The unit was created in 1918 as the Lento-Osasto II. During World War II it was to encompose the Fighter Squadrons 24, 26 and 28. The unit was moved to Rissala after the wars, and the fighter wing was divided between Flying Regiments 2 and 3. Flying Regiment 2, was later equipped with Fouga Magisters and MiG-21s. The unit flew MiG-21s from 1960 until 1998, when it received its F-18 Hornets.

Fighter Squadron 31 

The 31st Fighter Squadron is the operational unit of the Karelian Wing. During Peace-time, its main duty is to guard its assigned air space, and if needed, to prevent unpermitted use of it. In order to be able to do so, it is equipped with some twenty F-18 Hornet fighters and 5 liaison aircraft. The wing also operates an F-18 weapons training platform, called WTSAT or "Weapons Tactics and Situational Awareness Trainer". The unit also operates a number of specialist vehicles, including rescue and refueling vehicles.

In November 2018 it was announced that Lt Col Inka Niskanen would take charge of 31 Squadron as the first female commander of a Finnish fighter squadron, starting in 2019.

Organization 

Headquarters Flight
1st Flight Fighter flight, equipped with F-18C/Ds and also trains mechanics
2nd Flight Fighter flight, equipped with F-18C/Ds and trains pilots
4th Flight Liaison flight, equipped with Valmet Vinka, PA-31-350 Chieftain, Valmet L-90TP Redigo aircraft

Each flight has about 100 personnel, consisting of e.g.:

 Pilots
 Technical personnel
 Rescue personnel (also civilians)
 Equipment personnel (also civilians)
 Air traffic controllers (also civilians)
 Civilians

Conscripts are mainly used as help mechanics and as refuelers.

References

External links 
 Karelia Air Command

Finnish Air Force
Siilinjärvi